All Inclusive is a 2014 Danish comedy film directed by Hella Joof.

Cast 
 Mikael Birkkjær - Mogens
 Rasmus Bjerg - Henrik
 Carsten Bjørnlund - Anders
 Danica Curcic - Ditte
 Diogo Infante - Antonio
 Bodil Jørgensen - Lise
 Mia Lyhne - Tina

Remake

A French remake entitled  (Larguées in French speaking markets) was released in 2018.

References

External links 

 – Swedish remake
 – French remake

2014 comedy films
Danish comedy films